Robert Layton may refer to:

 Robert Layton (politician) (1925–2002), Canadian politician`
 Robert Hugh Layton (born 1944), British anthropologist
 R. T. Layton (1884–1941), English special effects artist
 Robert Layton (musicologist) (1930–2020), English musicologist and music critic